Wydarzenia (Events) is the news program of the Polsat, Poland's second biggest television channel, which started airing in 2004. The creator of “Wydarzenia” was Tomasz Lis. Currently, the editor-in-chief of the program is Dorota Gawryluk (at first from March to December 2016, then from March 2018 to present times). The program is produced and aired from Polsat News studio in Warsaw. In 2021, it was confirmed that average audience of "Wydarzenia" is estimated to be at 1.72 million.

Wydarzenia has four editions each day:
 at 12:50 p.m. (on weekdays) – shorter edition which presents a brief summary of the news,
 at 3:50 p.m. (on weekdays) – shorter edition which presents a brief summary of the news,
 at 6:50 p.m. – the main newscast,
 at 9:50 p.m. (only in Polsat News) – the evening forty-minute edition, a summary of the day.

References

Polish television shows
Polish television news shows
2004 Polish television series debuts
2000s Polish television series
2010s Polish television series
2020s Polish television series
Polsat original programming